José Rafael Amaya Núñez (born 28 February 1977) is a Mexican actor, born in Hermosillo, Mexico. He is best known for his character Aurelio Casillas in the Telemundo series El Señor de los Cielos.

Biography 
Amaya was born in Hermosillo, Mexico, but when he was five years old, his family moved to Tecate, Baja California where he grew up. In his adolescence, he took theater and music classes. Upon entering college, he moved to San Diego, California to study but left school before graduating. After leaving college, he returned to Mexico to try his luck with a music group, the Palapa Band, which did not prosper. Amaya decided to enroll in the Centro de Educación Artística of Televisa, attempting to enter the world of music with another group, Garibaldi, with which he recorded two albums.

Career

Beginnings and notable roles (2000–2010) 
After leaving his short musical career, in 2000, his first acting role was on the telenovela La casa en la playa, where he played Romualdo; after gaining attention in the role, he received offers for roles in other productions. In 2001, he was cast in the role of Cástulo in Sin pecado concebido. In 2002, he was given his first lead role in the telenovela Salomé, where he plays José Julián, one of Salomé's three sons, a role that solidifies him as a bonafide actor and earns him two nominations, one for the El Heraldo de México and another for the TVyNovelas Awards. In that same year, he is called to be part of the cast of Las vías del amor. In 2003, he again secures a leading role in the telenovela Amar otra vez with Irán Castillo and Valentino Lanús. His film debut comes in 2004 with the film Desnudos, in which he shares credits with Karyme Lozano and Isabel Madow. In 2006, he goes to Miami, United States to film Las dos caras de Ana with his ex-partner Ana Layevska. In that same year, he returns to the cinema co-starring with Ana de la Reguera and Gabriela Platas in the controversial film Así del precipicio. In February 2008, he began filming 24 cuadros de terror, where for the first time in his career, he played a serial killer. In that same year he filmed the romantic comedy film Amor letra por letra with Plutarco Haza and Silvia Navarro, which premiered in August of that year. He also participated in the film Me gustas tú, a film that pays homage to the late comedian Germán Valdés, which also stars Carmen Salinas and Luis Felipe Tovar. That year proved to be a busy one with much activity having also appeared in the series Mujeres asesinas and Sexo y otros secretos. At the end of that same year, he began filming the feature film North, a thriller about immigrants who were robbed of their organs and then trafficked. He also appeared in the video clip of Enrique Iglesias song, "Lloro Por Ti".

In 2009 he ventured further into the film industry. The frantic activity continued in 2010 playing Julián García Correa, a doctor with a mental disorder, in the telenovela of Telemundo Alguien te mira. This production was the first time in which Amaya played a villain in a telenovela. In 2011 he had a brief role in the very successful telenovela La Reina del Sur, playing the role of “El Guero,” who was the love interest of Kate del Castillo’s character and was the foundation on which the role of Aurelio Casillas in “Senor de Los Cielos” was based (both characters were pilots who had their own fleets of planes which were used to transport drugs for Mexico's most notorious cartels). In that same year, he traveled to Spain to participate in two series Hospital Central and Doctor Mateo and in the film La piel azul.

Mainstream and critical success (2013–present) 

After his trip to Spain, he was absent from the acting world for a year and a half. In 2013 he joined the cast of the television film of Hallmark Channel, entitled Meddling Mom, which had begun filming 2012, and where he played Pablo. In that same year, he was selected by Telemundo to play Aurelio Casillas a famous drug trafficker in the super series El Señor de los Cielos, which is based on the life of Amado Carrillo Fuentes. Thanks to his performance he won as Favorite Lead Actor at the 2014 Premios Tu Mundo. Since first taking on this career-making role, he has won the prize three times consecutively in all the awards galas of Premios Tu Mundo. In 2014, he appeared in the short film Kiss of Vengeance, and in the film based on the life of the actor Cantinflas. He also participated in two episodes in the series Señora Acero as Aurelio Casillas. In 2015 he got his first lead role in a film, entitled Oro y polvo.

In 2016 he also had a guest role (and cameo appearance) in the American series Queen of the South, which was an adaptation of the telenovela La Reina del Sur, where he also played Aurelio Casillas. In December of that same year, he again played Aurelio in the spin-off of the series El Señor de los Cielos, entitled El Chema.

Personal life 
Amaya was in a relationship with actress Ana Layevska, whom he met in 2006 while working on the telenovela Las dos caras de Ana. In 2007, they made their relationship official and both actors committed to getting married, but in 2010 Amaya ended his relationship with Layevska.
In 2010, after ending his relationship with Layevska, he confirmed his relationship with the actress Angélica Celaya, whom he met in the telenovela Alguien te mira. In 2014, they got engaged, but ended their relationship in 2015.

[35] In 2023, Amaya officially confirmed his relationship with Maritza Ramos, a finance and business major.  '''Maritza Ramos''' ,Mexican-American who is the actor's manager. "Rafa fell in love with her some time after they worked together," Rafael Amaya met Ramos two and a half years ago when she began to manage the finances of his businesses. Time made the Mexican fall in love with her. "He is very proud of Maritza."

And it is not for less, Ramos has a master's degree in business administration and international law and a degree in accounting and finance, she also served as director of finance for a government agency. "She is a very intelligent woman and he admires her a lot," says the source.

The professional connection was instantaneous, and Ramos left her government job to dedicate herself fully to Amaya's career, first as his accountant and now as his manager. "Rafael got to know her and little by little he saw how brilliant she was and what a precious and divine person and a family woman, it was what attracted him a lot."  To this day, the relationship is going strong with commitment plans to marriage in the future, the couple already shares a home with their two cats and a puppy. "They both love animals," says the source. "They love their relatives, they are very attached to their family."  Despite the fact that Ramos is not a lover of the spotlight, she always proudly accompanies '''Amaya'''. "They are inseparable, Rafa wants to keep their relationship sacred," added the source. "She has a great sense of humor."

Awards and nominations

References

35.

External links 
 

1977 births
Living people
Mexican male telenovela actors
Mexican male television actors
Mexican male film actors
Mexican male models
Mexican television presenters
Male actors from Sonora
21st-century Mexican male actors
People from Hermosillo
21st-century Mexican singers
21st-century Mexican male singers
People from Tecate